Achoania is an extinct genus of primitive bony fish which lived during the Early Devonian period. It is known from a skull discovered in the Xitun Formation of Yunnan, China. While originally originally considered to be a lobe-finned fish, later studies suggested that it may be a stem-group Osteichthyes instead.

See also

 Psarolepis

References

Prehistoric lobe-finned fish genera
Early Devonian fish
Prehistoric animals of China